The Lesmânița is a left tributary of the river Podriga in Romania. It flows into the Podriga in Seliștea.

References

Rivers of Romania
Rivers of Botoșani County